Riddings Junction Viaduct (or Riddings Viaduct) is a disused cross-border railway bridge over Liddel Water between Kirkandrews, in Carlisle, north-western England, and Canonbie in Dumfries and Galloway, south-western Scotland. It is a listed building in both countries; the Scottish section is category A listed, and the English section is grade II*.

Description
The viaduct consists of nine semi-elliptical, depressed arches on an unusually sharp skew, crossing the river in a sweeping curve. It is built from local red sandstone and faced in ashlar. The arches are supported on tapering rectangular piers. The stonework has decorative channelling which continues diagonally through the soffits. A brick parapet and iron handrail were added in the late 20th century.

History
The viaduct was built for the North British Railway at the very beginning of its branch from Riddings Junction on the outskirts of Carlisle to Langholm in Scotland, part of the Waverley Route. The viaduct runs from the south bank of Liddel Water in Kirkandrews-on-Esk in Cumbria to the north bank near Rowanburn, in the parish of Canonbie, Dumfries and Galloway. It opened on 18 March 1864 and closed, with the rest of the line, on 18 September 1967; the viaduct has been disused ever since. It carried a single track for its entire operational life; the rails were removed when the line closed.

See also
List of Category A listed buildings in Dumfries and Galloway
Grade II* listed buildings in the City of Carlisle
List of listed buildings in Canonbie
Listed buildings in Kirkandrews-on-Esk

References

Category A listed buildings in Dumfries and Galloway
Grade II* listed railway bridges and viaducts
Grade II* listed buildings in Cumbria
Railway bridges in Cumbria
Railway bridges in Scotland
Bridges completed in 1864